Guillermo Durán and Andrés Molteni were the defending champions but chose not to defend their title.

Denys Molchanov and Igor Zelenay won the title after defeating Martín and Pablo Cuevas 4–6, 6–3, [10–7] in the final.

Seeds

Draw

External Links
 Main Draw

Moneta Czech Open - Doubles
2018 Doubles